Einen Jux will er sich machen (1842) (He Will Go on a Spree or He'll Have Himself a Good Time), is a three-act musical play, designated as a Posse mit Gesang ("farce with singing"), by Austrian playwright Johann Nestroy. It was adapted from John Oxenford's A Day Well Spent (1835), and first performed at the Theater an der Wien in Vienna on 10 March 1842. The music was by Adolf Müller.

Although about half of Nestroy's works have been revived for the modern German-speaking audience and many are part and parcel of today's Viennese repertoire, few have ever been translated into English, because Nestroy's language is not only stylized and finely graduated Viennese dialect, but also full of multiple puns and local allusions.

Einen Jux will er sich machen is the only one that has become well known to English-speaking theatre-goers. It has become a classic more than once. It was adapted twice by Thornton Wilder, first as The Merchant of Yonkers (1938), then as The Matchmaker (1955), which later became the musical Hello, Dolly!. It also achieved success as the comic masterpiece On the Razzle, which was adapted by Tom Stoppard in 1981. Stoppard claims in his introduction that in most of the dialogues he did not even attempt to translate what Nestroy wrote.

Roles

Zangler, spice trader in a small town
Marie, his niece and ward
Weinberl, Zangler's apprentice
Christopherl, Zangler's apprentice
Kraps, Zangler's servant
Frau Gertrud, Zangler's housekeeper
Melchior, a lazy servant
August Sonders, Marie's impoverished suitor
Hupfer, a master tailor
Madame Knorr, milliner in Vienna
Frau von Fischer, widow
Fräulein Blumenblatt, Zangler's sister-in-law
Brunninger, merchant
Philippine, milliner
Lisett, Fräulein Blumenblatt's parlour maid
A landlord
A coachman
A guard
Rab, a crook
First waiter
Second waiter

Synopsis
Weinberl and Christopherl go off to Vienna when they should be looking after Zangler's shop, only to run straight into their boss. (See the plot of On the Razzle for more details.)

Films
A film entitled Einen Jux will er sich machen was made for television in 1956, directed by Alfred Stöger, with Josef Meinrad as Weinberl, Inge Konradi as Christopherl, Hans Thimig as Kraps, Richard Eybner as Zangerl, Ferdinand Mayerhofer as Melchior, and Gusti Wolf as Marie.

References

Further reading
Branscombe, Peter (1992), "Nestroy, Johann Nepomuk" in The New Grove Dictionary of Opera, ed. Stanley Sadie (London) 
Einen Jux will er sich machen, Nestroy Centre, accessed 21 February 2011 (in German)

External links

1842 plays
Plays by Johann Nestroy
Possen mit Gesang
Plays set in Austria
A Day Well Spent